Kornevo is a rural locality (a village) in Rozhdestvenskoye Rural Settlement, Sobinsky District, Vladimir Oblast, Russia. The population was 24 as of 2010.

Geography 
Kornevo is located 38 km north of Sobinka (the district's administrative centre) by road. Kornilkovo is the nearest rural locality.

References 

Rural localities in Sobinsky District